Barry Patriquin (born 1962 in Oxford, Nova Scotia) is a paralympic athlete from Canada competing mainly in category T53 sprint events.

Barry twice competed in the Paralympics, firstly in 2000 where he competed in the 100m and won a bronze medal as part of the Canadian 4 × 100 m relay team in the class T54 relay.  He then moved up to 400m in the 2004 Summer Paralympics where he finished outside the medals.

References

Athletes (track and field) at the 2000 Summer Paralympics
Athletes (track and field) at the 2004 Summer Paralympics
Living people
Paralympic track and field athletes of Canada
Paralympic bronze medalists for Canada
Medalists at the 2000 Summer Paralympics
1962 births
Paralympic medalists in athletics (track and field)
Canadian male wheelchair racers